The King! is an album by jazz saxophonist Illinois Jacquet which was recorded in 1968 and released on the Prestige label.

Reception

Scott Yanow of Allmusic stated, "Tenor saxophonist Illinois Jacquet has never made an indifferent record, and this CD reissue of a Prestige date from 1968 has its strong moments. ... Enjoyable music but not all that essential".

Track listing
All compositions by Illinois Jacquet except as indicated
 "A Haunting Melody" – 5:20 
 "I Wish I Knew (How It Would Feel to Be Free)" (Billy Taylor) – 6:40 
 "The King" (Count Basie) – 5:34 
 "Caravan" (Duke Ellington, Irving Mills, Juan Tizol) – 3:28 
 "Blue and Sentimental" (Basie, Mack David, Jerry Livingston) – 6:30 
 "How High the Moon" (Nancy Hamilton, Morgan Lewis) – 5:29 
 "A Haunting Melody" [alternate take] – 2:55 Bonus track on CD reissue 
 "Blue and Sentimental" [alternate take] (Basie, David, Livingston) – 5:17 Bonus track on CD reissue

Personnel
 Illinois Jacquet – tenor saxophone, bassoon
 Joe Newman – trumpet
 Milt Buckner – organ, piano
 Billy Butler – guitar
 Al Lucas – bass, tuba
 Jo Jones – drums
 Montego Joe – congas, bongos

References 

1968 albums
Illinois Jacquet albums
Prestige Records albums
Albums produced by Don Schlitten